Mohamed Rizk (born June 1, 1993) is an Egyptian professional footballer who currently plays as a defensive midfielder for the Egyptian club Elgouna SC.

Career
In August 2017, Rizk signed a 3-year contract for Al-Assiouty moving from Aswan.

References

External links 
 Mohamed Rizq at KOOORA.com
 Mohamed Rizk at Footballdatabase

1993 births
Living people
Egyptian footballers
Association football midfielders
ENPPI SC players
Pyramids FC players
Aswan SC players
El Gouna FC players
Al Ahly SC players
Egyptian Premier League players